Belgium–Malaysia relations refers to foreign relations between Belgium and Malaysia. Belgium has an embassy in Kuala Lumpur, and Malaysia has an embassy in Brussels.

History 
In 1968 Malaysia's Deputy Premier and Defence Minister, Tun Abdul Razak, toured the Belgian Navy mine school.

Economic relations 
In 2000, a trade mission from Wallonia, was interested in joint-venture partners with Malaysian industry. Silvana Flagothier, the head of the delegation said: "We are convinced that Malaysia is a very good base to establish representative office and joint-venture". In 2001, the Malaysian Association of Belgium and Luxembourg was formed by the Embassy of Malaysia in Brussels. In 2002, Malaysian Minister of International Trade and Industry Rafidah Aziz said Belgium could serve as a "gateway for Malaysian companies venturing into the European market, while Malaysia can serve as the competitive springboard for Belgian companies entering the East Asian markets". In 2006 Essensium NV, a computer chip manufacturer raised US$7.1 million from Atlantic Quantum Sdn. Bhd. of Malaysia. In 2007, Vanbreda International of Belgium chose Malaysia as its global operations centre.

In 2016, Malaysia ranks 11th among the biggest buyers of Belgian potatoes with a spending of RM306 million (€64.5 million) on 65,718 tonnes of imported potato fries, of which 9,689 tonnes were from Belgium. There is also a Malaysia Belgium Luxembourg Business Council.

Notable Belgian companies that operate in Malaysia are Oleon, Lhoist, Materialise NV, Puratos, Victor Buyck Steel Construction, Vyncke and DPO International.

See also 
 Foreign relations of Belgium
 Foreign relations of Malaysia

References 

 
Bilateral relations of Malaysia
Malaysia